The Blueflower Formation is a geologic formation in Northwest Territories. It preserves fossils dating back to the Ediacaran period.

See also 

 List of fossiliferous stratigraphic units in Northwest Territories

References 

 

Ediacaran Northwest Territories